The Life I Live is the 2000 debut solo album by American R&B singer, Torrey Carter. The album was led by the top 20 R&B hit, "Take That" (featuring Missy Elliott); the album also listed "If It's Money That You Want" as the second single, where it began to gain minor airplay. However, both singles failed to become much of a success, thus the album was shelved.

Track listing
From Yahoo Music.

 "Floss Ya Jewels"
 "Take That" (featuring Missy Elliott)
 "Shotgun" (featuring Lil' Mo)
 "The Life I Wanna Live" (featuring Nokio of Dru Hill)
 "Cream (Ride or Die)" (featuring Lil' Mo & Nokio of Dru Hill)
 "We Gon' Do"
 "If It's Money That You Want"
 "Now I Got a Girl"
 "Same 'Ol" (featuring Missy Elliott)
 "It Takes Two" (featuring Lil' Mo)
 "Insanity"

Leftover Tracks

 "O.K." (featuring Missy Elliott, Petey Pablo & Trick Daddy)
 "Tight Jeans"

Reviews
Allmusic  [ link]

References 

2000 debut albums
Albums produced by Missy Elliott
Albums produced by Timbaland
Unreleased albums